The  is a river in Toyama Prefecture, Japan. The river rises from Mount Daimon on the border of Ishikawa Prefecture and enters the sea at Toyama Bay.

The kanji that spells Oyabe means "little arrow room", but this may be a case of ateji, in which the kanji spelling was applied to the word, regardless of meaning.

Geography

Tributary 
Konade River
Yamada River

References

Rivers of Toyama Prefecture
Rivers of Japan